is a railway station in Mimata, Miyazaki, Japan.

Lines

Layout 
The station consists of an island platform serving two tracks. The station building is a wooden structure remodelled recently in western style. It houses an enclosed waiting room and an automatic ticket vending machine. The ticket window is unstaffed. Access to the island platform is by means of a footbridge.

Adjacent stations

History
In the next phase of expansion, the track was extended east, with Mimata opening as the new terminus on 11 February 1914. By 21 September 1917, the track had reached  and line was renamed the Miyazaki Main Line. On 15 December 1923, Mimata was designated as part of the Nippō Main Line together with the entire stretch through Miyazaki, Miyakonojō to Yoshimatsu. With the privatization of Japanese National Railways (JNR), the successor of JGR, on 1 April 1987, the station came under the control of JR Kyushu.

Passenger statistics
In fiscal 2016, the station was used by an average of 260 passengers (boarding only) per day.

See also
List of railway stations in Japan

References

External links
Mimata (JR Kyushu)

Railway stations in Miyazaki Prefecture
Railway stations in Japan opened in 1914